Rollinia parviflora is a species of plant in the Annonaceae family. It is endemic to Brazil.

References

parviflora
Endemic flora of Brazil
Near threatened plants
Near threatened biota of South America
Taxonomy articles created by Polbot